The Queensway Twin Bridges (sometimes Queens Way Bridges or Queensway Bay Bridge) connect downtown Long Beach with the outer Port of Long Beach. They are the southernmost crossing of the Los Angeles River, near the mouth of the river, where it empties into Queensway Bay, and they are the primary arterial link between Long Beach and RMS Queen Mary. The bridges were completed in June 1970 and opened on October 5, 1970.

History
During the planning and construction phase, the bridge was known as the Magnolia Avenue Bridge or Magnolia Bridge. The consulting engineering firm headed by Martin A. Nishkian was retained to design the bridge.

The Bridges were built relatively quickly. The superstructure was prefabricated offsite, shipped and partially assembled before being erected in 14 pieces over only 11 days. Murphy Pacific fabricated the complete superstructure in their Richmond, California yard and shipped it to Long Beach in 30 sections via barge.

By 1972, the Bridges had taken on their present name.

In April 2010, seismic retrofits were started on ramps leading to the Bridges. The contractor abruptly abandoned work in November 2010, with the contractor stating they had not been paid and the County of Los Angeles finding fault in the contractor's work to-date.

Design
Each bridge carries an orthotropic deck atop steel box girders. The deck is coated with an epoxy asphalt wearing surface.

The main span includes a central ,  drop-in section which was lifted in place by the Marine Boss floating crane. The drop-in span is supported on each side by a  section cantilevered off the pier.

The Bridges subsequently won an AISC Prize Bridge Award in 1971.

In popular culture

The cost of closing the Queensway Bridges is only US $2,500 per day, facilitating filming on weekdays when many other Los Angeles-area locations are difficult to close. The Queensway Twin Bridges have served as the filming locations for numerous television shows and movies, most notably in:
 CSI: Miami (2002–12): Numerous instances.
 Anchorman: The Legend of Ron Burgundy (2004): The biker, played by Jack Black, throws Ron's dog Baxter off the Queensway Twin Bridges.
 Dexter (2006–13): In the season 2 episode The British Invasion (2007), Lila parks under the bridge and examines Dexter's bag of tools; and in the season 3 episode The Lion Sleeps Tonight (2008), Dexter meets with Miguel Prado under the bridge.
 Bedtime Stories (2008): A candy truck gets into an accident on the bridge, raining gumballs on Skeeter.
 Get Smart (2008): Driving scenes were shot on the bridge.
 Transformers: Revenge of the Fallen (2009): The bridge served as a freeway in Shanghai.
 Knight and Day (2010): Roy and June ride a motorcycle across the bridge (with the location transplanted to Spain).
 The Bridge (2013–14): The Queensway Twin Bridges served as the eponymous Bridge of the Americas.
 Agents of S.H.I.E.L.D. (2013–): An explosion scene for the Season 1 episode titled "The Bridge" was filmed on November 6, 2013.
 Rosewood (2015–): The Season 1 finale featured a car explosion filmed on the bridge.

See also
 
 
 
 
 List of crossings of the Los Angeles River

References

External links
 
 
 

Bridges in Los Angeles County, California
Road bridges in California
Buildings and structures in Long Beach, California
Bridges completed in 1970
Los Angeles Harbor Region
Steel bridges in the United States
Box girder bridges in the United States